Razak may refer to:

People

Given name

Razak Boukari (b. 1987), Ghanaian footballer
Abdul Razak Hussein (1922-1976), Malaysian politician; second Prime Minister of Malaysia
Razak Nuhu (b. 1991), Ghanaian footballer
Razak Omotoyossi (b. 1985), Beninese footballer
Razak Pimpong (b. 1982), Ghanaian footballer
Razak Salifu (b. 1988), Ghanaian footballer
Abdul Razak Hussin (1920-1977), Malaysian politician; MP of Lipis

Surname or patronymic
Abdul Razak (canoeist) (b. 1964), Indonesian canoer
Abdul Razak (footballer) (b. 1992), English footballer
Abdul Razak (Guantanamo detainee 1043), Afghanistani politician
Azizan Abdul Razak (b. c. 1940), Malaysian politician
Brimah Razak (b. 1987), Ghanaian footballer
Hamdi Razak (b. 1985), French footballer
Ibrahim Abdul Razak (b. 1983), Ghanaian footballer
Ismail Abdul Razak (b. 1989), Ghanaian footballer
Karim Abdul Razak (b. 1956), Ghanaian footballer
Mohammed Razak, Qatari footballer
Najib Razak (b. 1953), Malaysian politician
Nazir Razak (b. 1966), Malaysian banking executive
U Razak (1898-1947), Burmese politician and educationalist

Places
Razak, Fars, a village in Iran
Razak, Mazandaran, a village in Iran
Razak, Qazvin, a village in Iran
Razak, Razavi Khorasan, a village in Iran
Razak, South Khorasan, a village in Iran

Other uses
Razak Report, Malayan educational proposal written in 1956

See also
Razaq (disambiguation)
Razzak (disambiguation)
Razzaq (disambiguation)